Louisville Classical Academy (LCA) is nonsectarian, independent school for grades kindergarten through eight. The school is located in the Highlands neighborhood of Louisville, Kentucky. The principal tools of a classical liberal arts education at Louisville Classical Academy are literature, Latin, Greek, mathematics, and music.

Accelerated learning
The LCA curriculum includes English, mathematics, science, history, Latin, Greek, art, music fundamentals, and choral music. Students also study geography, logic and rhetoric, and literature such as Homeric epics. Electives vary by quarter, with offerings such as drama and soccer. Private music instruction in piano, voice, guitar, and violin is available on a weekly basis.  The average class size is eight.

Student life
LCA student activity opportunities include participation in the National Junior Classical League.  LCA has fielded academic teams at MathCounts, and the statewide Governor's Cup and National Quiz Bowl competitions. In 2013, the youngest contestant in the Scripps National Spelling Bee was a third-grade student from LCA. Members of the LCA chess team have received awards at the local, regional, and state levels.

Faculty
The LCA faculty and administrative staff consists of 26 people, drawn from a number of schools, including St. John's College, The Juilliard School, Manhattan School of Music, Oberlin College, University of Mary Washington, Earlham College, Boston College, University of California, Centre College, Vanderbilt University, and Bellarmine University, as well as state universities of Kentucky.

School history
LCA opened as a full-time institution in 2007 in Prospect, Kentucky. The school was founded by Marcia Cassady, a former lawyer; Amanda Proietti; and DrGerald Proietti. The founding board was also included Angela Dworin from the University of Chicago and Richard Dworin from the University of Kentucky.

Accreditation
Founded in 2007, LCA has recently become eligible for accreditation by the Kentucky Non-Public Schools Commission.

External links
 Louisville Classical Academy online
 Louisville Classical Academy on Facebook

Private schools in Louisville, Kentucky
Private high schools in Kentucky
Private elementary schools in Kentucky
Private middle schools in Kentucky
Preparatory schools in Kentucky
Educational institutions established in 2007
High schools in Louisville, Kentucky
2007 establishments in Kentucky